"Lotus Inn" is a song by American boy band Why Don't We. The song was released on December 4, 2020 by Signature and Atlantic Records, as the second single from their second studio album The Good Times and the Bad Ones. A music video to accompany the release of "Lotus Inn" was first released onto YouTube on December 7, 2020.

Background
On December 2, 2020, the band announced the release date of the single across multiple social media platforms.

Charts

References

2020 songs
2020 singles
Why Don't We songs